The 2021 Nunavut general election was held on October 25, 2021, to return the members of the 6th Nunavut Legislature. Since the adoption of a fixed election date law in 2014, general elections in Nunavut are held in the last Monday of October in the fourth calendar year following the last elections. The Legislative Assembly of Nunavut can be dissolved earlier by the Commissioner of Nunavut on the advice of the Premier of Nunavut.

Unlike most legislatures in Canada, the Legislative Assembly of Nunavut operates on a non-partisan consensus government model. Candidates in territorial elections run as independents rather than being nominated by political parties. The premier and executive council are then selected internally by the MLAs at the first special sitting of the new legislative session.

The election was held using single-member districts and successful candidates were determined through the first past the post system.

Candidates
The following are the unofficial results. (X) indicates the incumbent

Aggu

Aivilik

Amittuq

Arviat North-Whale Cove

Arviat South

Baker Lake

Cambridge Bay

Gjoa Haven

Hudson Bay

Iqaluit-Manirajak

Iqaluit-Niaqunnguu

Iqaluit-Sinaa

Iqaluit-Tasiluk

Kugluktuk

Netsilik

Pangnirtung

Quttiktuq

Rankin Inlet North-Chesterfield Inlet

Rankin Inlet South

South Baffin

Tununiq

Uqqummiut

References

2021 general election
2021 in Nunavut
Nunavut general election
October 2021 events in Canada